Anna Kitex Group (also known as Kitex) is an Indian conglomerate founded by M. C. Jacob in 1968 and based in Kizhakkambalam, Ernakulam in Kerala.

The group initially made aluminum products such as kitchen utensils and cookware in the 1970s, and later ventured into producing spices, textiles, and bags. Its flagship company, Kitex Garments Limited, is reportedly the world's second-largest infant clothing manufacturer. It also runs a non-profit, political organization called Twenty20 Kizhakkambalam.

History 
In 1968, M. C. Jacob founded Anna Aluminum Limited with eight workers. Anna Aluminum Limited changed its name as Anna Group in 1972 and launched a packaged curry powder brand.

In 1978, Anna Group launched a garment brand called Kitex Limited, an acronym of 'Kizhakkambalam Textiles'.  

In 1992, Anna Group expanded its business to the global markets by launching Kitex Garments Limited.

In the early 2000s, Anna Group was rebranded as Anna Kitex Group.

In 2011, after the death of M. C. Jacob, company management split between his sons. The elder son handles business in domestic markets, while the younger son runs its international business.

As of 2021, Kitex Garments, a subsidiary of the Group, is the world’s second largest infant wear producer as well as a major supplier to Walmart and Amazon. The Group is one of the largest private sector employers in the state of Kerala.

In July 2021, Kitex Garments Limited announced that they are investing  crore in Telangana by setting up a factory at the Kakatiya Mega Textile Park in Warangal, after dropping their earlier plan of investing  in Kerala.

Brands 

 Kitex Limited
 Anna Aluminum
 Saras Spices
 Chakson Products
 Dezire Bags
 ScooBee Day Bags

References

External links 

 

1968 establishments in Kerala
Conglomerate companies of India
Conglomerate companies established in 1968